(born October 21, 1976) is a Japanese softball player who played as a pitcher between 1996 and 2004 in the Olympic Games. She won two medals for Japan.

References

Japanese softball players
Living people
Softball players at the 2000 Summer Olympics
Olympic softball players of Japan
Olympic silver medalists for Japan
Softball players at the 2004 Summer Olympics
Olympic bronze medalists for Japan
Softball players at the 1996 Summer Olympics
1976 births
Olympic medalists in softball
Asian Games medalists in softball
Softball players at the 2002 Asian Games
Softball players at the 1998 Asian Games
Medalists at the 1998 Asian Games
Medalists at the 2002 Asian Games
Asian Games gold medalists for Japan
Asian Games silver medalists for Japan
Medalists at the 2004 Summer Olympics
20th-century Japanese women
21st-century Japanese women